Protubera canescens is a species of truffle-like fungus in the Phallogastraceae family. It is found in Western Australia, where it grows under Eucalyptus.

References

External links

Fungi described in 1986
Fungi of Australia
Hysterangiales